The Blackout is a 2009 American science fiction horror film directed by Robert David Sanders and starring Barbara Streifel Sanders, Joseph Dunn, Ian Malcolm, Michael Caruso, Caroline Rich, Anthony Tedesco, and James Martinez. The film is about the occupants of The Ravenwood as they try to escape the building during a citywide blackout, all the while being stalked by terrifying creatures.

Plot

The film takes place during Christmas Eve when a citywide blackout traps the tenants in The Ravenwood. As the building's occupants try to escape the building they find themselves stalked and attacked by terrifying creatures. The group must work together in order to escape and survive the blackout.

Cast
 Barbara Streifel Sanders as Elizabeth Pierce
 Joseph Dunn as Daniel Pierce
 Ian Malcolm as Dylan Pierce
 Michael Caruso as Ethan Devane
 Caroline Rich as Claire Devane
 Anthony Tedesco as Freddy Appleton
 James Martinez as Eddie Clifton

Release
The Blackout was released in the United States on December 24, 2009. In Spain the film was premiered on television on September 30, 2012. The film was released on DVD on August 30, 2013. The film was released on DVD in the UK on August 30, 2010, on March 30, 2009 it was announced that Starway Pictures had acquired rights to distribute the film internationally and Cinemavault distributing the film in Canada.

Reception

Scott A. Johnson from Dread Central awarded the film a score of 2.5 out of 5, writing, "Although admirably ambitious for what was obviously a very low budget creature feature, I do believe another rewrite or two and a more charismatic cast were the ills that prevented The Blackout from shining brighter than it did."
HorrorNews.net gave the film a negative review, criticizing the story as being "trite and too convenient". Andrew Smith from Popcorn Pictures gave the film a score of 4/10, writing, "The Blackout is paint-by-numbers monster movie making at its most predictable. A few decent ideas are dwarfed by the rehash of a lot of plagiarized ideas. Ambition seems to have been held back by budget or unwillingness to experiment with the formula and that’s a pity."

References

External links 
 
 
 
 
  Blackout blog site

2009 films
2009 horror films
2000s monster movies
2000s science fiction horror films
2000s Christmas horror films
American Christmas horror films
American science fiction horror films
American monster movies
Films shot in Los Angeles County, California
2000s English-language films
2000s American films